KLM uk was the brand name of a British airline subsidiary of KLM, which operated services within the UK and between the UK and the Netherlands using ATR-72, Fokker 50 and Fokker 100 aircraft. KLM uk had its headquarters in the Stansted House on the grounds of London Stansted Airport in Stansted Mountfitchet, Essex.

History
KLM launched the brand name "KLM uk" in 1998, when KLM acquired majority ownership of AirUK, a commuter airline founded in 1980. Air UK began to be traded as KLM uk in January 1998. The legal name changed from Air UK Limited to KLM uk Limited.

In 2000, KLM uk launched Buzz, a low-cost subsidiary which operated a fleet of BAe 146 and Boeing 737-300 aircraft. Buzz was sold to Ryanair in 2003, at which point the remainder of KLM uk operations were merged into KLM Cityhopper.

Destinations
KLM uk served destinations within the United Kingdom as well as from there to Continental Europe.

Fleet

As of January 2003, the KLM uk fleet consisted of the following aircraft:

References

External links

 KLM UK (Archive)

Defunct airlines of the United Kingdom
Airlines established in 1998
Airlines disestablished in 2003
Air France–KLM
KLM Cityhopper